Babich is a surname. Notable people with the surname include:

 Babette Babich (born 1956), American philosopher
 Bob Babich (disambiguation), multiple people, including:
Bob Babich (American football coach) (born 1961), American football coach
Bob Babich (linebacker) (born 1947), American football player 
 George Babich (1918–1984), American professional wrestler and college basketball head coach
 Iskra Babich (1932–2001), Soviet film director and screenwriter
 Ivan Babich (born 1982), Russian politician
 Joe Babich (1940–2022), New Zealand winemaker and businessman
 Johnny Babich (1913–2001), American baseball player
 Josip Babich (1895–1983), New Zealand gum-digger, winemaker and farmer
 Mikhail Babich (born 1969), Russian politician and member of the State Duma of the Russian Federation
 Shaikhzada Babich (1895–1919), Bashkir poet, writer and playwright
 Svetlana Babich (born 1947), Soviet female javelin thrower
 Valery Babich (born 1941), Ukrainian writer, journalist, and shipbuilder
 Yevgeny Babich (1921–1972), Russian ice hockey player

See also
 Babić
 Babych